The 2005 Copa de S.M. La Reina de Fútbol was the 23rd edition of Spain's women's football national cup. The previous edition's reduction to four teams was reverted, and the cup was contested by the top eight teams in the 2004-05 Superliga from May 15 to June 12, 2005.

Defending champion Levante UD defeated CFF Puebla in the final to win its fifth title in six years. AD Torrejón and Rayo Vallecano also reached the semifinals.

Qualification

Teams by autonomous community

Results

Quarter-finals

|}

Semifinals

|}

First leg

Second leg

Final

References

Copa de la Reina
Women
2004-05